Matthew David Morris (born January 6, 2003), better known as MattyB or MattyBRaps, is an American singer and rapper who launched his career by creating remixes of popular music and posting them to YouTube.

Morris has released numerous covers and remixes of mainstream music since he began his career in 2010. His first cover was of "Eenie Meenie" by Justin Bieber. On August 1, 2014, MattyB's YouTube channel surpassed one billion views. As of July 13, 2015, he has posted over 90 additional covers and 20 original songs on his YouTube channel. On August 27, 2015, his debut EP premiered on YouTube, titled Outside the Lines. The album consists of four original songs. On June 7, 2016, Morris released a memoir book, That's a Rap, with the help of writer Travis Thrasher.

Life and career
Morris was born on January 6, 2003, in Duluth, Georgia, and has three older brothers and a younger sister.

Morris' first song with original lyrics was a remix of "I Believe in You", released on June 22, 2010. His first song available for purchase was a remix of "Just the Way You Are", released on August 11, 2010, featuring Tyler Ward. In late 2012, he peaked at 11th on the Billboard Social 50 Chart with the music video for "That's the Way", which doubled his number of followers on social media sites Facebook, Twitter and YouTube.

Morris has made several appearances on television, including Today, The Wendy Williams Show, Dr. Phil, WWE, and The Queen Latifah Show. He has also featured other artists, including Vanilla Ice, James Maslow, and Carson Lueders.

References

External links
 Official website

2003 births
American child musicians
American child singers
American male rappers
American pop musicians
Child pop musicians
Living people
People from Duluth, Georgia
Pop rappers
Rappers from Georgia (U.S. state)
American YouTubers
21st-century American rappers
21st-century American male musicians
American folk-pop singers